"Nada Que Me Recuerde a Ti" ("Nothing That Reminds Me of You") is a song written and recorded by Marco Antonio Solís. Released in October of 2008, this is his second single from his 8th studio album No Molestar.

Track listing

Charts

References

2008 singles
Marco Antonio Solís songs
Songs written by Marco Antonio Solís
Spanish-language songs
Fonovisa Records singles
2008 songs